Saint-Vallier is a municipality of about 1,100 people in Bellechasse Regional County Municipality in the Chaudière-Appalaches administrative region of Quebec in Canada.

Notable people
 

Laurent Catellier (1839–1918), physician and professor
Jack Marshall (ice hockey) (1877–1965), hockey player
Louis-Rodolphe Roy (1858–1925), lawyer, politician and judge

References

Municipalities in Quebec
Incorporated places in Chaudière-Appalaches
Designated places in Quebec